The Fujifilm X-T200 is a mid-range mirrorless interchangeable-lens camera announced on January 22, 2020. The X-T200 is the successor to the Fujifilm X-T100, but most features of the X-A7 are carried over to the X-T200.

The camera is capable of recording video in 4K resolution in 30 fps. It can be had in either camera body only, or with the 15–45 mm  OIS PZ lens. The camera is styled after an SLR camera and comes in 3 colors, silver, dark silver and champagne gold.

Key features 
 Hybrid Electronic and Mechanical Horizontal Focal Plane shutter system gives up to 1/4000 sec, up to 60 min. in Bulb mode
 Main Subject Recognition
 24.2 megapixels
 23.5 mm x 15.7 mm CMOS sensor (APS-C). Bayer filter array with no anti-aliasing filter.
 Fully-articulate Touch Screen
 Selectable film simulations
 Hybrid autofocus
 Face detection
 Eye detection
 4K video (15 min. max recording time)
 4K Burst, 4K Multi Focus
 Wi-Fi connectivity
 Bluetooth connectivity
 3.5mm audio jack
 USB-C
 Built-in grip

Features 

The X-T200 looks nearly identical to its predecessor, the X-T100. It is a mirrorless compact camera measuring 121 mm x 83.7 mm x 55.1 mm and weighing 370 g including memory card and battery, nearly 100g lighter than the X-T100.

The X-T200 is equipped with a Bayer type color filter array with no anti-aliasing filter. It is 3.5 times faster than the X-T100 at data processing, due to the copper wiring, where the X-T100 uses aluminum.

The camera has Wi-Fi connectivity complemented by Bluetooth for connection and tagging via a smartphone. It comes in three different colors, Dark Silver, Silver and Champagne Gold.

Unlike the X-T100, the X-T200 is equipped with a joystick instead of a directional pad. Its LCD screen is fully articulated, unlike the X-T100's 3-way tilt.

Other noticeable improvements are the ability to record in 4K is 30 fps, a 3.5mm audio jack and a USB-C connection, X-T100 only has a microUSB, a 2.5mm audio jack and can only do 4K in 15fps. Compared to the X-T100 that can take 430 photographs per charge, the X-T200 can only take 270 per charge. The X-T100's grip is screw-on, where as the X-T200 grip is built-in. The X-T200 is also $100 more than its predecessor.

Included accessories
 Li-ion battery NP-W126S
 USB cable
 Headphone Adapter
 Shoulder strap
 Body cap
 Owner's manual

References

External links

X-T200
Cameras introduced in 2020